Our Little Wife is a 1918 silent film directed by Edward Dillon. The film is based on the 1916 play of the same name by Avery Hopwood. It is not known whether the film currently survives.

Cast
 Madge Kennedy as Dodo Warren
 George J. Forth as Herb Warren
 Walter Hiers as Bobo Brown
 William Davidson as Doctor Elliot
 Kempton Greene as Tommy Belden
 Marguerite Marsh as Angie Martin
 Wray Page as Mrs. Elliot

References

External links
 

American silent feature films
1918 films
1918 comedy-drama films
1910s English-language films
American black-and-white films
1910s American films
Silent American comedy-drama films